SSK Talent M.A.T Plzeň is a handball club from Plzeň, Czech Republic, that plays in the Chance Extraliga.

History 
The club was founded in 1953. Talent Plzeň win the first title in 1974 in Czechoslovak Handball League. The club was doing well in the 1998 and 1999, when won Czech Handball Extraleague.TJ Lokomotiva Plzeň and SSK Talent Plzeň affiliated in 2010. The club has been doing well in recent season, because the club won Czech Handball Extraliga  5 times and 2 times finished at 2nd place.

Crest, colours, supporters

Club crest

Kits

Management

Team

Current squad 

Squad for the 2022–23 season

Technical staff
 Head Coach:  Petr Štochl
 Assistant Coach:  Jiří Hynek
 Fitness Coach:  Adolf Blecha
 Masseur:  Zdeněk Koranda

Transfers

Transfers for the 2022–23 season

Joining 
  Stefan Terzić (RB) from  RK Celje
  Nikola Kosteski (RW) from  UHC Hollabrunn

Leaving 
  Petr Linhart (RW) to  HC Einheit Plauen
  Leonard Kaplan (LB) to  HBC JVP Strakonice 1921
  Richard Křesťan (GK)
  Eduard Wildt (RW) 
  Marek Korbel (RB)

Previous squads

Accomplishments 

 Czech Handball Extraliga:
 : 1998, 1999, 2014, 2015, 2016, 2019, 2021
 : 2017, 2018
 : 2000

Czechoslovakia Handball League:
 : 1974
 : 1955, 1956, 1958, 1963, 1970, 1971, 1972, 1976, 1984,  
 : 1959, 1960, 1961, 1962, 1965, 1966,

European Records

EHF ranking

Former club members

Notable former players

  Roman Bečvář (2006–2012)
  Ladislav Brykner (2010–2011)
  Jiří Hynek (1998–2002)
  Petr Linhart (2008–2016, 2020–2022)
  Alois Mráz (1996–2001)
  Karel Nocar (1996–1998, 1999–2001)
  Leoš Petrovský (2012–2015)
  Martin Šetlík (1987–1992, 1997–1999, 2007–2008)
  Jakub Šindelář (2009–)
  Jan Stehlík (2017–)
  Jan Štochl (1992–2002, 2016–2018)
  Petr Štochl (1992–2000, 2001–2002)
  Michal Tonar (1985–1988, 1990–1991, 1996–1999)
  Nikola Kosteski (2022–)
  Stefan Terzić (2020, 2022–)

References

External links
 
 

Czech handball clubs
Handball clubs established in 1953
Sport in Plzeň